Dolichoderus transversipetiolaris is an extinct species of Miocene ant in the genus Dolichoderus. Described by Zhang, Sun and Zhang in 1994, the species was discovered after a fossil of a queen was found in China.

References

†
Miocene insects
Fossil taxa described in 1994
†
Fossil ant taxa